"Stealin'" is a song by British hard rock band Uriah Heep, from the concept album Sweet Freedom. The song was written by Ken Hensley, and it reached gold status in New Zealand. The B-side of the song is "Sunshine".

Chart performance

Personnel
 David Byron – vocals
 Mick Box – guitars
 Ken Hensley – keyboards
 Lee Kerslake – drums
 Gary Thain – bass

References

1973 singles
Uriah Heep (band) songs
Songs written by Ken Hensley
Bronze Records singles
1973 songs